Samudra Gupta (born Abdul Mannan; June 23, 1946 – July 19, 2008) was a Bangladeshi poet and journalist. Gupta was a strong critic of both communalism and Islamic fundamentalism, and expressed his opposition to these ideologies within his writings.

Early life and career
Gupta was born Abdul Mannan on June 23, 1946, in Hashil village in Sirajganj sub-division. Mannan adopted the pseudonym of Samudra Gupta during the 1960s and was recognized by his pen name during his life and career. He took part in the start of the uprising against Pakistan beginning in 1969 and fought in the Bangladesh Liberation War.

Gupta was originally a journalist by profession. He worked as different daily and weekly newspapers throughout Bangladesh. He also served as the general secretary of the country's National Poetry Council.

He wrote thirteen books of poetry during his career, as well as one work of fiction and an additional book of poetry as a collaboration with another writer. he also released many articles and short stories and served as the editor of several books.

Gupta's most notable writings include Rode Jholshano Mukh, Swapnamongol Kabyo, Ekhono Utthan Achhey, Chokhey Chokh Rekhey, Ekaki Roudrer Dike and Shekorer Shokey. His writings have been translated from Bengali into Chinese, French, Sinhalese, English, Hindi, Japanese, Urdu, Norwegian and Nepali.

Gupta died of gallbladder cancer on July 19, 2008, at the Narayana Hridayalaya Hospital in Bangalore, India. He had been hospitalized in India for treatment since July 3, 2008. He was buried at Martyred Intellectuals Memorial.

Awards
 Jessore Literature Award 
 Humayun Kabir Award
 Poet Vishnu Dey Award
 Language Day Honour by the Government of Tripura

References 

1946 births
2008 deaths
20th-century Bangladeshi poets
Bangladeshi short story writers
Bangladeshi journalists
Bangladeshi activists
People of the Bangladesh Liberation War
Deaths from cancer in India
Deaths from gallbladder cancer
Bangladeshi male poets
Burials at Mirpur Martyred Intellectual Graveyard
20th-century male writers
20th-century journalists